Jean-Baptiste Lepère (December 1, 1761 – July 16, 1844) was a French architect, father-in-law of the architect Jacques Hittorff.  He was the designer of the church of Saint-Vincent-de-Paul, Paris, largely revised by Hittorf during its protracted execution, and one of the architects who worked on raising the colonne Vendôme.

Lepère was one of the many members of the Commission des Sciences et des Arts taken by Bonaparte on his Egyptian Expedition. While there, Lepère also produced drawings of ancient Egyptian temples and other remains.

Other members of this commission were Jacques-Marie Le Père (1763–1841) and his brother Gratien Le Père (1769–1826), engineers and surveyors, who were to see whether Napoleon's planned project of linking the Mediterranean Sea with the Red Sea across the Nile delta could be realised and if the difference in sea level between the two was sufficiently small to make such a canal possible.

Sources 

 This page is a translation of Jean-Baptiste Lepère on French wikipedia.
 Drawings by Jean-Baptiste Lepère
 Views of Karnak
 
 Jean-Baptiste Lepère on Structurae

1761 births
1844 deaths
Architects from Paris
18th-century French architects
19th-century French architects
French Egyptologists
Commission des Sciences et des Arts members